Kyptoceras is a small extinct artiodactyl ungulate mammal of the family Protoceratidae, endemic to southeastern North America from the Miocene to Early Pliocene epoch 23.03—3.6 Ma, existing for approximately . The species name, amatorum, comes in honor of all amateur fossil collectors, including Frank Garcia (Ruskin, Florida) the amateur who found it and donated it to the Florida Museum of Natural History.

Taxonomy
Kyptoceras is the last known member of the family. The protoceratids were believed to have been driven to extinction by more advanced grazing herbivores, but in Florida, where there were still relatively large tracts of forest, the protoceratids were able to survive. The genus name comes from its bent horns, in which the two horns above the eyes curved over its head, and the two nasal horns pointed forward.

Fossil distribution

Fossils have been recovered from: 
Tiger Bay Mine, Upper Bone Valley Formation, Polk County, Florida 
Lee Creek Mine, Yorktown Formation, Beaufort County, North Carolina

References

Protoceratids
Pliocene even-toed ungulates
Zanclean extinctions
Pliocene mammals of North America
Fossil taxa described in 1981
Prehistoric even-toed ungulate genera